Long Branch, West Virginia may refer to the following communities in the U.S. state of West Virginia:
Long Branch, Fayette County, West Virginia
Long Branch, Wyoming County, West Virginia